The 1946 Oregon gubernatorial election took place on November 5, 1946 to elect the governor of the U.S. state of Oregon. Republican incumbent Earl Snell defeated Democratic nominee and former U.S. District Attorney Carl C. Donaugh to win the election.

Election results

References

1946
Gubernatorial
Oregon
November 1946 events in the United States